Winwood may refer to

 Estelle Winwood, British actress
 Muff Winwood, British musician and record company executive, brother of Steve Winwood
 Ralph Winwood, British politician and diplomat
 Steve Winwood, British musician
 Winwood (album), a 1972 compilation album featuring the music of Steve Winwood
 Winwood, the fictional main character of the game Fate: Gates of Dawn